Begunkodor railway station is a Haunted railway station of Ranchi railway division of the South Eastern Railway zone of the Indian Railways. It serves the nearby area of Begunkodor and Jhalda town in the Purulia district in the Indian state of West Bengal. Passengers deserted the station and it had come to be known as haunted in Railway records. The station was listed by Railways as one of its 10 haunted stations in India.

History
Begunkodor station was set up by the joint efforts of the queen of Santals, Lachan Kumari and Indian Railways in the year 1960.

Controversy
According to the villagers of Begunkodor, in 1967, a railway employee reported the sighting of a woman's ghost, and it was rumored that she had died in a railway accident.
The next day he told people about it but they ignored him. A seemingly first-hand account of the incident was published, with details of what had actually happened at the time.

The real trouble started when the dead bodies of the station master and his family were found in their quarters. The station was subsequently closed as trains stopped making halts here due to alleged paranormal phenomena.

In the late 1990s the villagers formed a committee and asked the officials to reopen the station. In 2007, local villagers wrote to then Railway minister Smt. Mamata Banerjee and CPIM leader Basudeb Acharia, who belongs to Purulia and was member of the parliamentary standing committee on Railways at the time. But the haunted tag remains. Acharia said that railway employees had made up the story to avoid being posted there.
After 42 years, in August 2009, the railway station was finally reopened as a passenger train halt, by former Railway minister Mamata Banerjee.

However, regularly 10 trains halt here, but passengers still avoid using the station after sunset. It is believed that twice a week girl is seen running at with the train on the same day when she died. Few of the paranormal investigators has confirmed presence of abnormal electromagnetic waves at the station on specific time and on specific day of the week. Many ghost hunters have visited the station repeatedly. Presently Begunkodor railway station was being touted by certain people for some time as a ghost tourist spot to attract visitors.

References

Railway stations in Purulia district
Ranchi railway division
1960 establishments in West Bengal
Reportedly haunted locations in India